Eula is an unincorporated community in Callahan County, Texas, United States. It is part of the Abilene, Texas Metropolitan Statistical Area.

Geography
Eula is located at 32°20'32" North, 99°32'42" West (32.3423509, -99.5617473).

Demographics
As of the census of 1990, there were 125 people in the community.

History
A post office was founded at Eula in 1889. In 1913, the post office was closed, as population had fallen. By 1940, an independent school had been formed, and a number of families had moved into the area.  There are three churches in the area, a Southern Baptist Church, a United Methodist Church, and the House of Yahweh. A Lions Club also meets regularly in Eula.  Most homes in the Eula community have United States Postal Service addresses in Clyde, Texas.

School

The Eula Independent School District is located at the intersection of Farm to Market Road 603 and County Road 244.  The boundaries of the school reach west to the Abilene city limits, east to FM 604, south to the Dudley Hwy, and North to FM 351. The original school building burnt to the ground in 1943, and was rebuilt at the same location. In 1976 a new elementary wing was added, and in 1993 a Middle school wing was added. In 2000 the School opened the doors to a new state-of-the-art facility that would house Eula High School. Currently this building is the home of 7-12 grades. The Eula Pirates have made an appearance at the State Cross Country meet since 1997, placing as high as 2nd. They won a Softball state championship in 2006, and have made 6 appearances in the basketball state tournament: twice for the girls, once in the 1950s and in 1983; four times for the boys, in 1946, 1989, 2007, and 2011, where they won the State 1A Championship.

Notable people

Jack Favor, rodeo star falsely imprisoned in 1967 in Louisiana for two murders for which he was framed, released with acquittal in a second trial in 1974; born in Eula in 1911

References

Unincorporated communities in Callahan County, Texas
Unincorporated communities in Texas